USS Elden (DE-264) was an  in the service of the United States Navy.

Elden (DE-264) operated mainly in the Pacific Theater of Operations during World War II. Most notably, she participated in "Operation Forager" and "Operation Detachment". Elden earned six battle stars and was scrapped in 1947.

Namesake
Ralph Waldo Elden was born on 10 July 1907 in New York City. He graduated from the United States Naval Academy in 1931. Lieutenant Elden was serving as executive officer of the  during the Battle of Midway on 6 June 1942. When his commanding officer was wounded, he took charge and directed abandonment of his disabled and rapidly sinking destroyer until the decks were awash. He was killed in the water by an underwater explosion. He was posthumously awarded the Navy Cross.

Service history
Elden (DE-264) was launched on 6 April 1943 by Boston Naval Shipyard, Charlestown, Massachusetts; sponsored by Mrs. Margaret Newton Elden, wife of Ralph Waldo Elden; and commissioned on 4 August 1943.

Sailing from Norfolk on 13 October 1943 for duty with the Pacific Fleet, Elden arrived at Pearl Harbor on 17 November. She trained in anti-submarine and amphibious landing exercises and three times screened oilers to rendezvous with the 5th Fleet, the third time during the occupation of Kwajalein and Majuro in the Marshalls. She departed Pearl Harbor on 30 March 1944 to join a hunter-killer task group on patrol in the eastern Marshalls.

Elden departed Pearl Harbor again on 1 June 1944 with a convoy for Eniwetok, then saw action in the capture and occupation of the Marianas. She patrolled off Tinian to prevent enemy troops from landing behind American lines on Saipan. Her guns sank several barges the night of 25–26 June. After anti-submarine patrol off Eniwetok in early July, she returned to screening transports at Saipan, and deliver harassing fire on Tinian. During the invasion of Guam, she escorted convoys from Eniwetok.

Elden operated out of Manus from 26 August 1944, screening oilers to refueling rendezvous with ships invading the Palaus and Leyte. She returned to Pearl Harbor on 16 November for overhaul and remained there for amphibious and anti-submarine training. She escorted two convoys to Eniwetok in January and February 1945, then arrived off Iwo Jima on 7 March to patrol the transport area until 20 March. She returned to the west coast for overhaul, then operated from Ulithi from 21 July as escort for oilers refueling fleet units executing the final massive raids on Japan. Elden served in the Far East on occupation duty, then returned to San Francisco on 25 November. She was decommissioned at Mare Island Navy Yard on 18 January 1946, and sold on 12 July 1947.

References 
 Leach, D. (1987). Now Hear This, Ohio: The Kent State University Press.

External links

 
 

Evarts-class destroyer escorts
World War II frigates and destroyer escorts of the United States
Ships built in Boston
1943 ships